Sören Pellmann (born 11 February 1977) is a German politician. Born in Leipzig, Saxony, he represents The Left. Pellmann has served as a member of the Bundestag from Leipzig II in the state of Saxony since 2017.

Life 
From 1983 to 1995 he first attended the Polytechnic Secondary School "Adolf Hennecke" and then the Lichtenberg-Gymnasium in Leipzig-Grünau, where he passed his Abitur in 1995. This was followed by community service with the city of Leipzig in a home for severely and multiply handicapped children and young people. During his law studies at the University of Leipzig, he worked for Barbara Höll and Heidemarie Lüth, who were members of the German Bundestag at the time. Subsequently, he studied to become a teacher for special schools with a focus on education for the mentally handicapped and education for the learning disabled until 2009. He completed his subsequent legal clerkship at the "Adolph Diesterweg" Learning Special School in Leipzig and at the "Schule Rosenweg" Special School for the Mentally Handicapped in Leipzig.

Politics 
Pellmann joined the Party of Democratic Socialism (PDS) on his sixteenth birthday in 1993. He became active in local politics in Leipzig, and was elected to the city council in 2009. In the 2017 German federal election, he ran as The Left's candidate for Leipzig II. He narrowly defeated incumbent Thomas Feist, winning 25.3% of votes to Feist's 24.6%. He became the first member of his party to win a constituency in Saxony, and the only Left MP to win a constituency outside Berlin in 2017.

Pellmann was re-elected in Leipzig II in 2021. While his vote fell slightly to 22.8%, his margin increased to 4.4% as the second-placed candidate, Paula Piechotta of the Greens, won 18.4%. Pellmann's re-election was especially significant since The Left won only 4.9% of votes nationally, just short of the 5% electoral threshold, and was only entitled to proportional representation due to winning three constituencies: Berlin-Treptow-Köpenick, Berlin-Lichtenberg, and Leipzig II.

Within the party, Pellmann is considered a supporter of Sahra Wagenknecht. After the Russian invasion of Ukraine in February 2022, he and five other Left MdBs joined Wagenknecht in issuing a joint statement attributing responsibility for the war in part to the United States and NATO. This was met with harsh criticism from a number of party members, including foreign policy spokesman and party elder Gregor Gysi.

At the Left party congress in June, Pellmann ran unsuccessfully for the party co-leadership, winning 176 votes (31.6%) to MEP Martin Schirdewan's 341 (61.3%).

References

External links 

  
 Bundestag biography 

1977 births
Living people
Members of the Bundestag for Saxony
Members of the Bundestag 2021–2025
Members of the Bundestag 2017–2021
Members of the Bundestag for The Left